Marc Riolacci (died 12 January 2020) was a French football administrator, who served as President of the Ligue corse de football and was on the council of the French Football Federation.

References

2020 deaths
Date of birth missing
Year of birth missing
Place of birth missing
Place of death missing
French sports executives and administrators